Den is an album by electronica group Kreidler, released in 2012.

Cover artwork
The cover artwork is by Italian artist Enrico David. Analogously to the preceding Kreidler album Tank, there is an art piece on the front cover, and another one on the inner sleeve (vinyl version); the CD is packed in a jewel case with the artwork on two changeable cardboards.

Track listing

Music videos
The album is accompanied by a collaboration between film director Heinz Emigholz and Kreidler, with Emigholz contributing clips to all the songs on Den. The videos contain alternate song versions, most remarkable "Rote Wüste", where the video, at 21:12, runs nearly three times longer than the album version.

The readers of German magazine Spex voted "Rote Wüste" as favorite video No. 7 in the top ten for 2012. "Moth Race" won the 15th MuVi Award for "Best German Music Video" at the 59th International Short Film Festival Oberhausen in May 2013. The production company Filmgalerie 451 lists "Sun", "Rote Wüste" and "Moth Race" as trailers for Heinz Emigholz' film The Airstrip - Decampment of Modernism.

Released videos
 "Rote Wüste" – 21:12 (September 2012).
 "Cascade" – 5:52 (October 2012).
 "Sun" – 5:54 (November 2012).
 "Deadwringer" – 6:37 (December 2012).
 "Moth Race" – 3:55 (February 2013).
 "Celtic Ghosts" – 3:31 (May 2013).
 "Winter" – 8:02 (June 2013).

Personnel
Kreidler
Thomas Klein – drums, and electronic musical instruments
Alexander Paulick – guitar, and electronic musical instruments
Andreas Reihse – synthesizers, and electronic musical instruments
Detlef Weinrich – electronic musical instruments

Technical personnel
Guy Sternberg – recording, mixing
Florian von Keyserlingk – assistant
Stefan Betke – mastering (at Scape-Mastering Berlin, April 2012)

Reception
Den holds a score of 61 out of 100 ("generally favorable") based on 7 reviews on review-aggregating website Metacritic.

References

External links
 Discogs Kreidler Den
 Bureau-B Kreidler Den
 Kreidler Den

2012 albums
Kreidler (band) albums